The Little Comedian (lit: My Home..Funny First (Dad Taught)) is a 2010 GTH's Thai family and comedy film directed and written by Witthaya Thongyooyong and Mez Tharatorn.

Plot
Tok a turning 13 coming soon boy has a lot to live up to. Not only is he named after Thailand's legendary comedian 'Lor Tok', but he also is a descendant of a long lineage of comedians within his family. There's one problem though: Tok just isn't funny and his father is starting to realize this. With big shoes to high expectations, Tok struggles to come up with new gags in attempt to earn his father's respect. With all this pressure, Tok develops pimples. Afraid of acne, he consults dermatologist, Mo Namkhaeng, whom he falls in love at first sight with. Interestingly, she is not only beautiful and smart, but could actually be the first person to think that Tok is funny.

Cast
Chawinroj Likitcharoensakul as Tok (also spelled Tock)
Paula Taylor as Mo Namkhaeng (Dr. Ice)
Jaturong Mokjok as Ploen (Tok's father)
Orn-anong Panyawong as Cheun (Tok's mother)
Nichapat Charurattanawaree as Mon/ Salmon (Tok's young sister)
Kwanjit Sriprajan as Grandma
Tee Doksadao as Cham
Tik Gangkhaopun as  Ruammitr
Sripare Sidao as Thongkorn
Top Dokkradone as Yodson
Anna Chuancheun as Pipo
Čhiranan Pitpreecha as Mo Namkhaeng's mother (cameo)

Production
The Little Comedian is a film developed from a short film titled Tam Mai Tong Talok (ทำไมต้องตลก; Why funny) of Witthaya Thongyooyong one of the directors and screenwriters. The film uses Lop Buri as a backdrop and is the location for filming almost the whole story.

The film was released on March 11, 2010 and earning a total of 42 million baht, which is considered not very successful, it aired on Channel 7 on June 1, 2013 and December 30, 2018.

References

External links
 

Films shot in Thailand
Films set in Bangkok
Films set in Lop Buri
2010 comedy-drama films
2010 films
Thai comedy-drama films
GMM Tai Hub films